Metalnikovo is a rural locality (a village) in Dubovskoye Rural Settlement, Beryozovsky District, Perm Krai, Russia. The population was 120 as of 2010. There are 3 streets.

Geography 
Metalnikovo is located 9 km northwest of  Beryozovka (the district's administrative centre) by road. Sazhino is the nearest rural locality.

References 

Rural localities in Beryozovsky District, Perm Krai